The Armenian militia of Hunchaks (Social Democrat Hunchakian Party) of the city Zeitun (Süleymanlı) had resisted on two armed conflicts, first from August 30 to December 1, 1914, and second on March 25, 1915, to the Ottoman Empire.

First resistance
The first resistance, which lasted three months from (August 30, 1914, to December 1, 1914), was reported that Armenians defeated all the Ottoman troops. 60 Armenian militia died during the first conflict in a report. They helped fight and resist the impending massacre of the local Armenian civilian population.

Second resistance
It is reported that on March 25, 1915 Zeitun was captured by the Ottoman Army. The date for the beginning of the conflicts is not known, but in a report from the Ambassador in Constantinople (Wangenheim) to the Reichskanzler (Bethmann Hollweg) it was claimed that the fighting was going "past few weeks".

Popular Culture
The resistance is mentioned in The Forty Days of Musa Dagh.

See also
Zeitun rebellion (1895-96)

Notes

1915 in the Ottoman Empire
Armenian resistance during the Armenian genocide
1915 in Armenia
History of Kahramanmaraş Province